Ferdinand Havis (November 15, 1846 – August 25, 1918) was an American state legislator, businessman, government official, and state militia member in Arkansas.

Havis was born to his slave master and slave mother and was enslaved. He was a Republican. He owned a barbershop, about 2,000 acres of land, and his home. He is buried at  Bellwood Cemetery in Pine Bluff.

References

1846 births
1918 deaths